Aleksandar Čavrić (born 18 May 1994) is a Serbian professional footballer who plays as a winger or forward for Slovak club Slovan Bratislava.

Club career

Serbia, Belgium and Danmark
Čavrić made his senior debuts at Banat Zrenjanin, before switching to OFK Beograd in June 2012. He was the club's top scorer with 11 league goals (from 30 appearances) in the 2013–14 season. On 1 September 2014, Čavrić officially joined the Belgian club Genk on a three-year contract (plus a two-year option). He moved on a season-long loan to the Danish side Aarhus in August 2015, with an option for a permanent deal.

Slovan Bratislava
In September 2016, Čavrić signed a four-year contract with Slovak club Slovan Bratislava.

On 3 November 2022, Čavrić scored two decisive goals during UEFA Europa Conference League – Group H fixture at LFF Stadium versus Žalgiris Vilnius (2–1), which secured a Slovak club first advancement to  European play-off rounds in 17 years, when Čavrić's then-manager Vladimír Weiss Sr. led Artmedia Petržalka in the UEFA Champions League.

International career

Youth career
Čavrić represented Serbia at the UEFA European Under-19 Championship twice, winning the gold medal in 2013. He subsequently went on to play for the Serbia U21s, taking part in both the 2015 and 2017 UEFA European Under-21 Championship, as the team exited in the group stage.

Senior career
Following the match against Žalgiris Vilnius in November 2022, it was announced that Čavrić and Slovan began pursuing Slovak citizenship, which would make him eligible to represent Slovakia internationally. Later in November ahead of Slovak national team fixtures against Montenegro and Chile, national team manager Francesco Calzona informed that he would consider Čavrić to the national team once he meets eligibility requirements.

Statistics

Honours

Club
Slovan Bratislava
Fortuna Liga (4): 2018–19, 2019–20, 2020–21, 2021–22
Slovnaft Cup (4): 2016–17, 2017–18, 2019–20, 2020–21

International
Serbia
 UEFA Under-19 Championship: 2013

Notes

References

External links
 Futbalnet profile 
 

Aarhus Gymnastikforening players
Association football forwards
Association football midfielders
Belgian Pro League players
Danish Superliga players
Expatriate footballers in Belgium
Expatriate men's footballers in Denmark
Expatriate footballers in Slovakia
FK Banat Zrenjanin players
K.R.C. Genk players
OFK Beograd players
Serbia under-21 international footballers
Serbia youth international footballers
Serbian expatriate footballers
Serbian expatriate sportspeople in Belgium
Serbian expatriate sportspeople in Denmark
Serbian expatriate sportspeople in Slovakia
Serbian First League players
Serbian footballers
Serbian SuperLiga players
Serbs of Croatia
People from the Republic of Serbian Krajina
ŠK Slovan Bratislava players
Slovak Super Liga players
Sportspeople from Vukovar
1994 births
Living people